is a Japanese voice actor. He is affiliated with Across Entertainment. He voiced Tanjiro Kamado in Demon Slayer: Kimetsu no Yaiba, Ken Kaneki in Tokyo Ghoul, Inaho Kaizuka in Aldnoah.Zero, Takumi Aldini in Food Wars: Shokugeki no Soma, Kōsei Arima in Your Lie in April, Sieg in Fate/Apocrypha, Korai Hoshiumi in Haikyu!!, Vanitas in The Case Study of Vanitas, Haruichi Kominato in Ace of Diamond, Maki Katsuragi in Stars Align and The Duke of Death in The Duke of Death and His Maid.

Biography 
Hanae entered workforce while in high school. He thought about his career, but planned to become a voice actor. He joined Across Entertainment in November 2009. He made his first leading role in Tari Tari, and was credited as a composer for episodes 5 and 12. Hanae won the Best Rookie award at the 9th Seiyu Awards. He and Ryōta Ōsaka hosted the radio show . On August 27, 2016, Hanae announced that he had married a woman who is five years older than him. He began uploading Let's Play videos on YouTube in March 2019, amassing over 500,000 subscribers seven months later. On September 20, 2020, Hanae announced that he has become the father of a pair of fraternal twin girls.

On July 23, 2021, Hanae wrote on Twitter that his SNS accounts' (Twitter and YouTube) total followers surpassed two million people.

On January 27, 2022, Hanae tested positive for COVID-19. On February 7, 2022, it was announced that he had recovered.

Filmography

Anime series

Anime films

Original video animation

Original net animation

Drama CD

Video games

Dubbing roles

Television

Awards

Notes

References

External links 
  
 
 
 Natsuki Hanae at Nippon Columbia 
 

1991 births
Living people
Across Entertainment voice actors
Best Actor Seiyu Award winners
Japanese male video game actors
Japanese male voice actors
Male voice actors from Kanagawa Prefecture
Seiyu Award winners
21st-century Japanese male actors
Utaite
Japanese YouTubers